Awaous banana, the river goby, is a species of goby native to fresh and brackish water stream and rivers from the southern United States through Central America to Venezuela and Peru.  This species can reach a length of  SL.  It is important to local commercial fisheries.

References

External links
 Photograph

banana
Fish of South America
Fish of North America
Fish of Central America
Fish of Guatemala
Fish of the Dominican Republic
Fish described in 1837
Freshwater fish of Cuba